"Rocky Took a Lover" is a single by the Irish pop rock quintet, Bell X1, and the third to be taken from the band's third album Flock. It was released on 28 August 2006. It entered the Irish Singles Chart on 31 August 2006, spending four weeks there and peaking at #18. The single included a cover of the Depeche Mode song "Enjoy the Silence".

Many Irish radio stations, including Today FM, had been playing the track since before the release of the previous single "Flame" (as early as December 2005) and the song was used extensively to promote the band's third album. In early 2008, the song featured on a Dublin Bus television advertising campaign.

A special website—www.rockytookalover.com—was created by the band for the release of the song, featuring blogs written by the characters of Rocky and Adrianna. The BBC described it and previous single "Flame" as "two of the finest pieces of music written on this island".

The band performed the song when they appeared on the Late Show with David Letterman on 17 March 2008.

Track listings 
CDS 1704233
 "Rocky Took a Lover" - (4:08)
 "Butterflies" - (5:28)
 "Enjoy the Silence" - (3:36)
 "Rocky Took a Lover" - (3:14) (Joe Steer's Ag-Style Altercation)
7" 1704234
 "Rocky Took a Lover" - (4:08)
 "Enjoy the Silence" - (3:36)
CDS (Promo) CIDXDJ937 (released May 2006)
 "Rocky Took a Lover" - (4:04) (Single version)

Live performance 
The Irish Independent has said that "Rocky Took a Lover" "truly come(s) alive in concert".

Chart performance

References

External links 
 "Rocky Took a Lover" music video

2006 singles
Bell X1 (band) songs
2005 songs
Island Records singles
Songs written by Brian Crosby (composer)
Songs written by David Geraghty
Songs written by Paul Noonan